Insar (Inzara; , Insar oš) is a town and the administrative center of Insarsky District of the Republic of Mordovia, Russia, located at the confluence of the Issa and Insarka Rivers,  southwest of Saransk, the capital of the republic. As of the 2010 Census, its population was 8,687.

History
It was founded in 1648 as a fortress and a posad. Town status was granted to it in 1780; it was demoted to a rural locality in 1926. Town status was re-granted again in 1958.

Administrative and municipal status
Within the framework of administrative divisions, Insar serves as the administrative center of Insarsky District. As an administrative division, it is, together with one rural locality (the settlement of Zarya), incorporated within Insarsky District as the town of district significance of Insar. As a municipal division, the town of district significance of Insar is incorporated within Insarsky Municipal District as Insar Urban Settlement.

References

Notes

Sources

External links

Official website of Insar 
Insar Business Directory 

Cities and towns in Mordovia
Populated places established in 1648
1648 establishments in Russia
Insarsky Uyezd
Insarsky District